Charles of England may refer to the following monarchs of England and later the United Kingdom:
Charles I of England (1600–1649), King of England from 1625
Charles II of England (1630–1685), King of England from 1660
Charles III (born 1948), King of the United Kingdom since 2022

See also
 Charles Edward Stuart (1720–1788), Jacobite pretender to the British throne
 King Charles (disambiguation)
 Prince Charles (disambiguation)